Peter Shalson  (born February 1957) is a British businessman.

Early life
Peter Shalson was born in February 1957. He was educated at Hendon County School, and left at 16.

Career
Shalson made his first fortune in coat hangers and packaging materials.

In 2005 owned 800 pubs, and had a net worth of £60 million.

Personal life
Shalson has three daughters from his first marriage, and one from his second.

In 2003, he married for the third time, spending £5 million, hiring the Roundhouse in Camden for several weeks, and the musical entertainment was provided by Elton John (for £2 million) and Kool and the Gang.

Shalson lives in St John's Wood, London, and in 2011 received 200 hours' community service after he twice fired at a neighbour's burglar alarm with a shotgun, and then forced his way into the house and smashed it.

Shalson has been "hugely active" with the Presidents Club charity. He donated £1.5 million to the 
London Academy, a school in Edgware.

References

Living people
1957 births
British businesspeople
People from St John's Wood